Carlton S. King (December 15, 1881 – July 6, 1932) was an American film actor of the silent era. He also directed several films.

King also acted on stage. In 1900, he was a member of the American Opera Company.

King worked for the Edison Company for two years as a leading man and director. He also was employed by Vitagraph. He died while the film Partners (1932) was being made, and another actor dubbed his voice.

Partial filmography

 The Boston Tea Party (1915)
 The Mystery of Room 13 (1915)
 The Girl of the Gypsy Camp (1915)
 When Love Is King (1916)
 Little Miss No-Account (1918)
 After the Show (1921)
 Luring Lips (1921)
 Kick In (1922)
 The Texas Bearcat (1925)
 South of Panama (1928)
 Midnight Life (1928)
 The House of Shame (1928)
 The Peacock Fan (1929)
 Law of the Rio Grande (1931)
 Partners (1932)

References

Bibliography
 Langman, Larry. A Guide to Silent Westerns. Greenwood Publishing Group, 1992.

External links

1881 births
1932 deaths
American male film actors
People from St. Louis
American male stage actors